Laia Lluisa Tutzó Moreno (born 9 October 1980) is a Spanish former sailor, who specialized in the two-person dinghy (470) and Yngling classes. Together with her partner Natalia Vía Dufresne, a four-time Olympian and a double silver medalist, she was named one of the country's top sailors in the double-handed dinghy for the 2008 Summer Olympics, rounding out the top-ten crews in the final race. Outside her Olympic career, Tutzó helped the Azón sisters Monica and Sandra solidify a golden finish at the inaugural Yngling Worlds in 2002, before switching her yachting duty to pair up with Vía Dufresne and then Marina Gallego in the 470. A member of Port d'Aro Nautical Club in the outskirts of Barcelona, Tutzó trained most of her sporting career under the tutelage of Eneko Fernández, one of the federation's coaches in the double-handed dinghy.

Tutzó competed for the Spanish sailing squad, as a crew member in the women's 470 class, at the 2008 Summer Olympics in Beijing. She and skipper Vía Dufresne topped the selection criteria by an effortless, 82-point edge over the other tandem Gallego and Támara Echegoyen to lock the country's 470 berth among the females for the Games at the class-associated Worlds nearly eight months earlier in Melbourne, Australia. The Spanish duo entered the final race with a couple of runner-up marks recorded throughout the series, both of which came close to their provisional fourth and ninth-leg triumph, respectively, by the narrowest of margins. A costly penalty turn for an incident at the final upwind mark, however, pushed both Tutzó and Vía Dufresne to the back and out of the medals, sitting them in the tenth overall spot with 92 net points.

Notes

References

External links
 
 
 
 
 
 

1980 births
Living people
Spanish female sailors (sport)
Olympic sailors of Spain
Sailors at the 2008 Summer Olympics – 470
Sportspeople from Barcelona